Aṇaṅku is a phenomenon of sacred power described in ancient Tamil literature such as the Sangam literature. This sacred magical forces were supposed to inhabit various objects, which eventually determined there association with the society. The job of carrying out rites and rituals to control ananku was that of groups such as pariyans,  Tutiyans, and with lighting the cremation fire and worshipping memorial stone. literature]].

References

Tamil-language literature
Sangam literature
Indian poetics
Social history of Tamil Nadu